Oleksiy Oleksiyovich Goncharenko (born in Odesa, 16 September 1980) is a Ukrainian politician, member of the Ukrainian parliament, member of the Ukrainian delegation to the Parliamentary Assembly of the Council of Europe, Vice President of the PACE Committee on Migration, Refugees and Internally Displaced Persons, founder of the Ukrainian network of educational and cultural centres  – Goncharenko Centre. In 2014, he was elected to the Verkhovna Rada on the party list of Petro Poroshenko Bloc. In the 2019 Ukrainian parliamentary election Goncharenko was reelected as an independent candidate in single-seat constituency 137 (Podilsk).

Biography
Goncharenko is a son of former mayor of Odesa Oleksiy Kostusyev. His parents divorced when he was three years old.

From 1999 until 2001 Goncharenko worked in the Odesa emergency medical station. In 2002 he graduated with honors from Medical University, but chose a political career over a medical one.

In 2002, at age 21, he ran unsuccessfully for the Odesa City Council of the District in the village Tairove. After that he worked as an assistant for a deputy of the city council.

From 2002 Goncharenko was a student at Financial University under the Government of the Russian Federation in Moscow, Russia (Graduate School of Financial Management). He graduated from the Academy in 2005, receiving a degree in economics.

Political activity 
In 2005 he was elected chairman of the Odesa city organization of the party Soyuz.

In 2006 and 2010 he was elected to the Odesa City Council for Party of Regions.

During the 2012 Ukrainian parliamentary election he was a candidate in majority district 133 (in Odesa) lost to Ihor Markov with 20.6% of the votes (Markov gained 26.6%).

Before Euromaidan, Goncharenko was a member of the Party of Regions. On 19 February 2014 after the first deaths of the Euromaidan-protests Goncharenko wrote the statement on his withdrawal from the Party of Regions.

In the 2014 Ukrainian parliamentary election he was elected into the Ukrainian parliament for Petro Poroshenko Bloc placed number 40 on the party list. He became deputy head of the faction.

In the 2019 Ukrainian parliamentary election Goncharenko was reelected as an independent candidate in single-seat constituency 137 (Podilsk). Goncharenko is a member of the European Solidarity faction in the Verkhovna Rada.

On 1 March 2015 Goncharenko was arrested by Russian police during Nemtsov Memorial March. According to Goncharenko when in detention he was beaten and deprived of medical and legal help. Goncharenko was released from prison the next day but he promised to sue Russian Ministry of Internal Affairs.

He was included in the list of sanctions of the Russian Federation

PACE 
Since 2015, Oleksiy Goncharenko has been a member of the Permanent Delegation of the Verkhovna Rada to the Parliamentary Assembly of the Council of Europe. Throughout all these years, he sharply criticised Russia for violating human rights. Since 2019, he has opposed the return of the Russian delegation to work in PACE.

During his speeches in the Parliamentary Assembly, he criticised Moscow for human rights violations in the temporarily occupied Crimea and parts of the Donetsk and Luhansk regions, fought against Russian propaganda and narratives that the Kremlin planted through its delegates in PACE.

On 9 October 2018, Oleksiy Goncharenko spoke at a meeting of the Parliamentary Assembly of the Council of Europe in large rubber gloves. He said that without gloves it would be "unsafe to shake hands and touch door handles", hinting at the accusations of Russia in the poisoning of Skripals.

He repeatedly raised the issue of human rights violations in Belarus and the illegal actions of the Lukashenko regime. The Secretary General of the Council of Europe and the Committee of Ministers of the Council of Europe supported the creation of a special group that would be able to monitor and follow the situation in Belarus following Olekii’s many statements on the issue. Belarus is not a member of the Council of Europe, therefore it does not have its own delegation there but Goncharenko actively promotes the topic of sanctions against the dictatorial regime of Lukashenko in Belarus and works towards the state's democratisation. 

During the spring session in PACE in 2022, he actively advocated the creation of an international tribunal that would investigate Russian war crimes in Ukraine. As a result, PACE called for the urgent establishment of such a tribunal soon afterwards.

War in Ukraine 
After the start of a full-scale Russian invasion of Ukraine, Oleksii continued to fight Russian propaganda, which Goncharenko opposed to throughout all 8 years of the war. He began to actively cooperate with dozens of international media in order to bring the truth to the world about the real situation in Ukraine, as well as to draw direct attention to the necessary support measures that Western countries can provide.

He held online meetings with US congressmen and advocated tougher sanctions against Russia. For example, during a conversation with 50 US congressmen, he insisted on imposing an embargo on Russian oil and gas. Later, the United States imposed a ban on the export of Russian oil.

During the spring session of PACE in April 2022, he advocated holding a special international tribunal for Russian war crimes in Ukraine. As a result, the Parliamentary Assembly adopted a resolution calling for the establishment of such a tribunal.

During a visit to London in May 2022, he raised the issue of creating an international tribunal in a conversation with Foreign Minister Liz Truss. The head of the British Foreign Office assured that she had already discussed this possibility with the country's attorney general. In addition, Goncharenko actively promoted the idea of ​​seizing the assets of Russian oligarchs and using these funds for the benefit of Ukraine.

During the NATO summit in Madrid, he raised the issue of security in Ukraine and in Europe with leading European politicians.

Goncharenko supports Kosovar independence.

In December 2022, an international coalition on sanctions was created. Congressman, co-chair of the Helsinki Commission of the US Congress Steve Cohen, congressman, member of the Helsinki Commission Joe Wilson, MP Oleksiy Goncharenko, member of the Parliament of Great Britain Robert Sealy, head of the Estonian delegation to the PACE Erik Kross, member of the European Parliament from Lithuania Pietras Aushtrevičius, head of the Polish delegation at the Council of Europe Arkadiusz Mulyarczyk. They have already sent requests to Anthony Blinken and Josep Borrell for sanctions against Roman Abramovich, Ksenia Sobchak, Vladimir Potanin, Vladimir Lisin, Philipp Kirkorov and other Putin's close friends.

Belarus 
Before the elections in Belarus in 2020, Goncharenko understood that Lukashenko could usurp power and created an inter-factional association “For Democratic Belarus” in the Verkhovna Rada in order to monitor the situation in the neighbouring country at the parliamentary level. Later Lukashenko really did not want to transfer power in a democratic way and began to persecute the opposition, suppress mass protests by force, use torture on detained protesters, and subsequently open criminal cases.

Goncharenko has repeatedly raised the issue of human rights violations in Belarus in the Parliamentary Assembly of the Council of Europe. The Secretary General of the Council of Europe and the Committee of Ministers of the Council of Europe supported the creation of a special group that would be able to monitor and follow the situation in Belarus.

Goncharenko is in contact with the office of Svetlana Tikhanovskaya, meets with her on several occasions, and they discuss the state of human rights in Belarus, as well as possible support from Ukraine, including ways to help and support Belarusians in Ukraine.

Goncharenko centres 
Oleksii Goncharenko is a founder of the Ukrainian network of educational and cultural centres  – Goncharenko Centre. The main goal of them is to enable residents of small towns of Ukraine to learn foreign languages for free and improve their skills in other areas of science, art, and provide social activities opportunities. 

Thousands of children and adults visited social and cultural centres, thanks to free courses, schoolchildren improved their knowledge and easily entered universities, and adults received a great motivation for learning foreign languages ​​and inspiration for mastering new knowledge. More than 5 thousand people have completed the English language course and received the A2 language proficiency level. 1100 children prepared for the exam in English and in history at the Goncharenko Centres. Goncharenko Centres are visited by about 25 thousand people every month.

The Goncharenko Centres are funded by patrons and sponsors who are ready to invest in education and a better future for Ukrainians.

As of February 23, 2022, there were 24 Goncharenko Centres, including three centres in Donbas - in Kramatorsk, Konstiantynivka, and Lyman. The Goncharenko Centre employs about 89 people. After the start of the war, the Goncharenko Centres were reformatted into volunteer hubs, which now help not only the injured and Ukrainians in need, but also the military. The centres located in Donbas, and in the Kharkiv region – in the village of Dergachi, as well as in Chernihiv (in these cities the situation was the most difficult due to shelling and the Russian offensive) have worked for as long as it was possible.

Other 
On 23 February 2017, it was reported that Goncharenko had been kidnapped by unidentified attackers in Odesa. A few hours in a televised interview Goncharenko said he "was in a safe place" and Ukrainian prosecutors reported that the people involved in the kidnapping had been detained. Goncharenko claimed that his abduction was staged by the Ukrainian Security Service so that "separatist, terrorist groups operating in Odesa who planned causing me serious bodily harm" could be arrested.

On 1 November 2018, Oleksiy Goncharenko was included in the Russian sanctions list in connection with Ukraine's unfriendly actions towards citizens and legal entities of the Russian Federation.

On 8 February 2017, Goncharenko painted with red paint the word "Nein" (which is translated from German as "No") on the fragment of the Berlin Wall, installed in front of the Embassy of Germany in Kyiv. With this action, Goncharenko protested against the statement of the German Ambassador to Ukraine, Ernst Reichel, who said that the absence of Russian troops was not a prerequisite for holding elections in the Donbas. The Embassy of Germany in Kyiv responded to the incident with the following statement: "The Embassy of the Federal Republic of Germany is very much regretting the damage and disfigurement of the fragment of the historic Berlin Wall located on the territory of the Embassy by deputy Goncharenko. At the same time, there is a violation of the Vienna Convention on Diplomatic Relations."

Earnings
In 2010, in an interview with journalist Roman Skrypin, Goncharenko explained the origin of the 700 thousand dollars indicated in the 2010 declaration. He said that he borrowed the money from his father-in-law who worked at Gazprom.

According to the electronic declaration, in 2016, Goncharenko earned UAH 152.8 thousand as a deputy, he also received UAH 166.36 thousand compensation for rental housing, as well as UAH 26.4 thousand compensation for travel throughout the country. Deposits in banks brought Goncharenko UAH 97 thousand. His wife received from business activities UAH 1.43 million. The deputy had UAH 177 thousand and € 54.5 thousand on accounts in banks, as well as USD 45 thousand in cash. Goncharenko declared two apartments in Kyiv (with an area of 141.2 m²) and Odesa (with an area of 75.5 m²). Olha Goncharenko owns an apartment in Mykolaiv with an area of 54.5 m².

Personal life
Goncharenko is married to Olha, with whom he shared classes at Medical University. The couple has two sons - Oleksiy and Kyrylo.

References

External links
Personal website

1980 births
Living people
Politicians from Odesa
Odesa National Medical University alumni
Russian Presidential Academy of National Economy and Public Administration alumni
Party of Greens of Ukraine politicians
Soyuz (political party) politicians
Party of Regions politicians
Petro Poroshenko Bloc politicians
Eighth convocation members of the Verkhovna Rada
Ninth convocation members of the Verkhovna Rada
Members of the Parliamentary Assembly of the Council of Europe
Ukrainian YouTubers